José Manuel Gentil Quina, GOIH (born 3 October 1935) is a former Portuguese sailor. Together with his brother Mário he competed in the star class at the 1960 and 1968 Olympics, and won a silver medal in 1960. At the 1972 Games he placed 11th in one-person dingy. Quina served as the Olympic flag bearer for Portugal in 1968.

Orders
 Grand Officer of the Order of Prince Henry

References

1934 births
Living people
Sportspeople from Lisbon
Portuguese male sailors (sport)
Sailors at the 1960 Summer Olympics – Star
Sailors at the 1968 Summer Olympics – Star
Sailors at the 1972 Summer Olympics – Finn
Olympic sailors of Portugal
Olympic silver medalists for Portugal
Olympic medalists in sailing
Medalists at the 1960 Summer Olympics